This is a list of films produced by the Tollywood film industry based in Hyderabad in the year 1941.

References

External links
 Earliest Telugu language films at IMDb.com (63 to 73)

1941
Telugu
Telugu films